The 2016–17 St. Louis Blues season was the 50th season for the National Hockey League franchise that was established on June 5, 1967. The team played in its first Winter Classic game on January 2, 2017, defeating the Chicago Blackhawks 4–1 at Busch Stadium with 46,556 in attendance. It was only the third time in the nine Winter Classic games where the home team won. It was the Blues' first participation in a NHL Winter Classic game, while the Blackhawks lost for the third time in three appearances in the event.

Off-season
After associate coach Brad Shaw and assistant coach Kirk Muller decided to leave for other opportunities in late May 2016, Mike Yeo was announced on June 13, 2016, to replace coach Ken Hitchcock after his last year starting in the 2017–18 season. Yeo joined the Blues as associate coach, while Rick Wilson joined the staff as an assistant coach. Ray Bennett (assistant coach), Jim Corsi (goaltender coach) and Sean Ferrell (video coach) also returned. Yeo spent the majority of the previous five seasons as the head coach of the Minnesota Wild, leading the club to a 173–132–44 record, including a 46–28–8 mark in 2014–15, which was the second-best record in Wild history. Yeo also guided the Wild to three postseason appearances, including back-to-back trips to the second round in 2014 and 2015.

The Blues signed restricted free agent Dmitrij Jaskin, and unrestricted free agents Scottie Upshall and Kyle Brodziak. Minor leaguer Jordan Caron was also signed.

Steve Thomas was added as an assistant coach on June 30. He had spent the previous two seasons as an assistant coach for the Tampa Bay Lightning.

Training camp

Regular season

October

November

December
On December 28, Robby Fabbri became just the second Blues' player to record a hat-trick before the age of 21, joining Bernie Federko.

January
On January 20, two days after his 25th birthday, the Blues recalled goalie Pheonix Copley from their minor league affiliate Chicago Wolves, to cover Jake Allen's absence as he stayed home for the birth of his daughter. He made his debut (in relief) with the Blues on February 27, 2016. He made his first career start the following day (January 21) against the Winnipeg Jets. He was 11–4–2 with the Chicago Wolves prior to his callup, ranking ninth in the AHL in goals-against average (2.32) and save-percentage (.920). In the January 21 game, Copley, playing almost 59 minutes, gave up five goals on 29 shots, with the Blues losing 5–3. After his one start on January 21, Copley was assigned to the Chicago Wolves on January 25 and Allen returned to the Blues.

February
Ken Hitchcock was relieved of his duties as head coach by GM Doug Armstrong on February 1, with the Blues sitting in 4th place in the Central Division with 53 points. Mike Yeo was promoted from associate coach. He was scheduled to be head coach next season. Hitchcock had served as the head coach of the Blues since November 8, 2011, leading the Blues to a 248–124–41 regular season record over 5.5 seasons and ranking second on the Blues' all-time regular season wins list and fourth in NHL history overall with 781 career regular season wins. At the time of his firing, Hitchcock, 65, was 781–473–111 (with 88 ties) in 20 seasons with the Dallas Stars, Philadelphia Flyers, Columbus Blue Jackets and Blues. He sat fourth all-time in the NHL in coaching victories, behind Scotty Bowman (1,244), Joel Quenneville (831) and Al Arbour (782), and his 1,453 games coached were fifth. He won the Stanley Cup as coach of the Stars in 1999 and made the Cup Final in 2000, losing to the New Jersey Devils in six games. His teams made the playoffs 13 times in 14 full seasons. Goalie coach Jim Corsi was also been relieved of his duties, with Martin Brodeur and Ty Conklin taking over his duties for the rest of the year.

Since the start of the 2011–12 season, when Armstrong hired Hitchcock after 13 games, the Blues had a .644 point percentage. Only the Pittsburgh Penguins (.656) and Chicago Blackhawks (.648) were better. But following a 15-7-4 start in the 2016-17 season, the team sputtered to a 9-14-1 record in the following 24 games, a point percentage of just .395; only the Colorado Avalanche (.196) and Arizona Coyotes (.375) were worse over that stretch. Clinging to the second wild card spot in the Western Conference, in danger of missing the Stanley Cup Playoffs for the first time since 2010–11, Blues' GM Doug Armstrong cited the team's inconsistency in his decision to fire Hitchcock before the end of the season.

The Blues retired Bob Plager's No. 5 uniform in a ceremony on February 2, alongside his brother Barclay's No. 8, Al MacInnis' No. 2, Brett Hull's No. 16, Bernie Federko's No. 24, Bob Gassoff's No. 3, and Brian Sutter's No. 11. His No. 5 became the seventh jersey to be retired by the Blues and the 123rd among the NHL's 30 teams. Bob and Barclay Plager joined only one other pair of brothers to have their jerseys retired by the same team: Maurice "The Rocket" and Henri Richard of the Montreal Canadiens. He joined the club as a 21-year-old in an expansion draft trade with the New York Rangers in 1967 and became an instant fan-favorite thanks to his tenacious style of defense and his famous hip checks. He played 10 seasons in St. Louis, racking up 615 regular season games, 141 points and 762 penalty minutes. Plager retired from the league after the 1977–78 season, and subsequently held many positions with the organization, including head coach, vice president, director of professional scouting, director of player development, and ambassador within the Blues' Community Relations department.

Mike Yeo began his tenure as the 25th head coach in franchise history on February 2. Yeo spent ten seasons with the Pittsburgh Penguins organization and captured the 2009 Stanley Cup as an assistant. He then moved on to Minnesota, where he spent five seasons as head coach and led the Minnesota Wild to three postseason berths, including consecutive trips to the second round in 2014 and 2015.

Robby Fabbri (C) was injured midway through the first period in a February 4 game against the Pittsburgh Penguins, suffering a torn ACL in his left knee. He missed the remainder of the regular season (30 games) and the playoffs. At the time of his injury, Fabbri had recorded 11 goals and 18 assists for 29 points in 51 games played. The Blues recalled forwards Kenny Agostino (LW) and Magnus Paajarvi (LW) from the Chicago Wolves.

Carter Hutton and Jake Allen scored back-to-back shutouts on the road on February 6–7 of the Philadelphia Flyers (2–0), and Ottawa Senators (6–0), respectively. Hutton stopped 26 shots, and Allen stopped 30. Rookie Ivan Barbashev scored his first NHL goal in the waning minutes of the third period in Ottawa.

Patrik Berglund (C) scored the first "hat trick" of his career in a 4-2 win (February 11) over the Montreal Canadiens for their fourth consecutive win for the Blues in a tough five-game road trip, pushing them into the top three in the Central Division's guarantee of a playoff spot with 63 points, three points ahead of the next two teams. David Perron (LW) scored the other goal, and had an assist. Jake Allen made 28 saves on 30 shots.

Jake Allen (G) was named Second Star of the Week on February 13, for the week of February 6-12. Allen, went 3-0-0 with a 1.00 goals-against average, a .967 save percentage and his 13th career shutout against the Ottawa Senators (February 7). His two other wins were against the Toronto Maple Leafs (2-1 OT, 31 saves, February 9), and Montreal Canadiens (February 11).

On February 17, the Blues activated Kyle Brodziak (C) two weeks ahead of schedule. He suffered a right foot injury on January 24, against the Pittsburgh Penguins, and was placed on injured reserve two days later. He was expected to miss five weeks, but missed three weeks and 10 games. Wade Megan (C) was reassigned to the Chicago Wolves.

Paul Stastny (C) returned to the lineup on February 20, after missing four games with a lower-body injury against the Toronto Maple Leafs on February 9.

March
The Blues clinched a playoff spot on March 31, in a 2-1 shootout loss to the Colorado Avalanche at the Pepsi Center. The Blues (42-28-7) needed one point to qualify for their sixth consecutive trip to the postseason and 41st in their 50-year history. This marked the Blues' seventh playoff appearance in a span of 12 seasons. The club had previously reached the playoffs in 25 consecutive years between 1979 and 2004. They joined the Chicago Blackhawks, Pittsburgh Penguins and New York Rangers as the only teams to have reached the playoffs in each of the previous six seasons.

April
On April 8, the Blues clinched third place in the Central Division with a 5-4 shootout win over the Carolina Hurricanes in Raleigh. They had an 8-0-3 record in their final 11 games to finish the season with 99 points, 5 ahead of the fourth-place Nashville Predators.

The Blues (46-29-7; 99 pts., 235-218 GF–GA) played the second-place Minnesota Wild (49-25-8; 106 pts., 266-208 GF–GA) in the Western Conference First Round of the Stanley Cup Playoffs, which began on Wednesday, April 12 with the first two games in St. Paul.

Game 1 (Apr. 12) went to the Blues in a remarkable 51-save effort by goalie Jake Allen. The 51-saves were the fourth-most ever by a Blues goaltender in a playoff game, helping the Blues to a dramatic 2-1 overtime victory against Minnesota. Only Curtis Joseph (61 saves and 57 saves), and Ed Staniowski (54 saves) have posted more. Defenseman Joel Edmundson scored the winner in overtime. Recently acquired (C) Vladimir Sobotka gave the Blues a 1-0 lead at 6:21 of the second period. Sobotka played in his first playoff game with the Blues since 2014, after spending the three seasons in the Kontinental Hockey League. Zach Parise of the Wild ended Allen's 1-0 shutout bid when he scored with 22 seconds remaining in the third period, forcing the overtime frame. Edmundson scored the winner at 17:48 of the overtime.

Paul Stastny (C) was activated before the fifth game on April 22, after missing 14 games; 10 in the regular season and the first 4 in the playoffs against the Wild. He scored the Blues' third goal in the third period, giving the team a 3-1 lead. Magnus Paajarvi (LW) won the series with an overtime goal at 9:42. Jake Allen saved 34 of 37 shots in the 4-3 win.

In the Western Conference second-round series, the Blues were matched up against the Nashville Predators (41-29-12; 94 pts., 240-224 GF–GA), who swept the Chicago Blackhawks in their first-round series. As the higher seed, the Blues had home-ice advantage for the series. Nashville won the series opener 4-3, almost blowing a 3-1 second-period lead but pulling out the victory behind P.K. Subban's three-point game and Vernon Fiddler's game-winning goal late in the third period. The Blues tied the series with a 3-2 win in Game 2, handing Nashville their first loss of the 2017 playoffs, but the Predators won the subsequent two games to take a commanding 3-1 series lead.

On April 23, the Blues assigned Jordan Schmaltz (D) to the Chicago Wolves, and recalled prospect Thomas Vannelli (D), 22, who was acquired in the 2013 NHL Entry Draft #47 in round 2.

May
The Blues lost their second-round playoff series to Nashville, 4 games to 2, with Nashville clinching the series in a 3-1 Game 6 victory on home ice behind Pekka Rinne's 23-save effort and Ryan Johansen's game-winning goal. After a 33-20-5 regular season with a .915 save percentage and 2.42 GAA, Jake Allen finished his playoffs 6-5 with a .935 save percentage and 1.96 GAA. Regular-season team points leaders Vladimir Tarasenko (75 pts in 82 games), Jaden Schwartz (55 pts in 78 games), and Alexander Steen (51 pts in 76 games) scored a combined 22 points over the team's 11 playoff games, though they tallied just 5 combined points after Game 2 against Nashville as the Blues were held to 5 goals over the final 4 games of their series loss. After a 12-1-1 record in road games after Mike Yeo replaced Ken Hitchcock as head coach, including 3 road wins in the first-round series win over Minnesota, the Blues lost all three games in Nashville, held to a single goal in each loss.

Standings

Schedule and results

Pre-season

Regular season

Playoffs

Player statistics
Statistics

Skaters
Final as of April 9, 2017

†Denotes player spent time with another team before joining the Blues.  Stats reflect time with the Blues only.
‡Denotes player was traded mid-season.  Stats reflect time with the Blues only.

Goaltenders
Final game on April 9, 2017  

†Denotes player spent time with another team before joining the Blues.  Stats reflect time with the Blues only.
‡Denotes player was traded mid-season.  Stats reflect time with the Team only.

Playoffs
Final game on May 7

Awards and Milestones

Awards

Milestones

Detailed records

Transactions
The Blues has been involved in the following transactions:

Trades

Free agents acquired

Free agents lost

Claimed via waivers

Lost via waivers

Lost via retirement

Player signings

Draft picks

Below are the St. Louis Blues' selections at the 2016 NHL Entry Draft, to be held on June 24–25, 2016 at the First Niagara Center in Buffalo.

"NHL Draft Picks Tracker: First-round analysis from First Niagara Center in Buffalo"

26. St. Louis Blues (from Washington Capitals) - Tage Thompson, C, Connecticut (H-EAST)
NHL Central Scouting final North American ranking: 20

2015-16: 36 games, 14-18-32

"A right-handed power forward, Thompson began the season on the fourth line but soon was playing top line minutes. He has a great shot and led the NCAA with 13 power-play goals. Thompson (6-5, 195) is tough to knock off the puck, and good at protecting it and taking it to the net.

NHL.com quick hit: The Blues needed a big, strong center and Thompson, at 6-foot-5 and 195 pounds, has a giant frame that can get even bigger. With David Backes' future in St. Louis uncertain and Paul Stastny turning 31 next season, the time was right for the Blues to start to search for a future No. 1 center."

--

Draft notes

 The Washington Capitals' first-round pick went to the St. Louis Blues as the result of a trade on June 24, 2016 that sent a first-round pick and Washington's third-round pick both in 2016 (28th and 87th overall) to Washington, in exchange for this pick.
 The St. Louis Blues' first-round pick went to the Washington Capitals as the result of a trade on June 24, 2016 that sent a first-round pick in 2016 (26th overall) to St. Louis, in exchange for Washington's third-round pick in 2016 (87th overall), and this pick.
 The Calgary Flames' second-round pick went to the St. Louis Blues as the result of a trade on June 24, 2016 that sent Brian Elliott to Calgary, in exchange for a third-round pick in 2018, and this pick.
 The Washington Capitals' third-round pick was re-acquired as the result of a trade on June 24, 2016 that sent a first-round pick in 2016 (26th overall) to St. Louis, in exchange for a first-round pick in 2016 (28th overall), and this pick.

St. Louis previously acquired this pick as the result of a trade on July 2, 2015 that sent T.J. Oshie to Washington, in exchange for Troy Brouwer, Pheonix Copley, and this pick.

 The St. Louis Blues' third-round pick will go to the Buffalo Sabres as the result of a trade on February 28, 2014 that sent Ryan Miller, Steve Ott and conditional second and third-round picks in 2014 to St. Louis, in exchange for Jaroslav Halak, Chris Stewart, William Carrier, a first-round pick in 2015, and this pick (being conditional at the time of the trade). The condition – Buffalo will receive a third-round pick in 2016 if Miller does not re-sign with St. Louis for the 2014–15 NHL season – was converted on July 1, 2014 when Miller signed with Vancouver.
 The Columbus Blue Jackets' fifth-round pick will go to the St. Louis Blues as the result of a trade on November 15, 2014 that sent Jordan Leopold to Columbus, in exchange for this pick.
 The St. Louis Blues' fifth-round pick will go to the Edmonton Oilers as the result of a trade on February 27, 2016 that sent Anders Nilsson to St. Louis, in exchange for Niklas Lundstrom, and this pick.
 The Florida Panthers' fifth-round pick will go to the Chicago Blackhawks (then to the St. Louis Blues), as the result of a trade on March 2, 2014 that sent Brandon Pirri to Florida, in exchange for a third-round pick in 2014, and this pick.
 The St. Louis Blues' sixth-round pick will go to the Toronto Maple Leafs as the result of a trade  March 2, 2015 that sent Olli Jokinen to St. Louis, in exchange for Joakim Lindstrom, and this pick (being conditional at the time of the trade). The condition – Toronto will receive a sixth-round pick in 2016 if St. Louis fails to make it to the 2015 Stanley Cup Finals – was converted on April 26, 2015.
 The Pittsburgh Penguins' seventh-round pick will go to the St. Louis Blues as the result of a trade on March 2, 2015 that sent Ian Cole to Pittsburgh, in exchange for Robert Bortuzzo, and this pick.

References

St. Louis Blues seasons
St. Louis Blues
St Louis
St Louis